The Meteosat visible and infrared imager (or MVIRI) is the scientific instrument package on board the seven Meteosat first-generation geostationary meteorological satellites.  This instrument is capable of capturing images in the visible, infrared, and water vapor regions of the electromagnetic spectrum.

External links 
EUMETSAT page about MVIRI on Meteosat-7.
The MVIRI The Meteosat Visible and Infrared Imager page from the World Meteorological Organization

Weather imaging satellite sensors